The Lord Mayor of Birmingham's Charity Cup, commonly referred to as the Birmingham Charity Cup, was a football competition for teams from Birmingham and the surrounding area. It was inaugurated in 1881 by the city's mayor, Richard Chamberlain, and Aston Villa were the first winners of the competition in the 1881–82 season, defeating Walsall Swifts 4–1. From 1910 onwards, the preliminary rounds were scrapped and the final became an invitation match.  Other than during the First World War, the competition took place every year until 1939 with the exception of the 1925–26 season, when it was abandoned due to the General Strike.  It fluctuated between being contested at the start and the end of the football season.

The competition was discontinued after the Second World War, other than on two occasions in the 1960s when the youth teams of Aston Villa and Birmingham City competed for the trophy.  After this, the competition was discontinued altogether and the trophy itself used for the Birmingham Senior Amateur Cup competition.

Trophy
The trophy was made by Birmingham silversmith William Spurrer, and contained 14lbs of silver.  It was surmounted by a figure of a footballer and bore shields engraved with the initials of Chamberlain and the members of the Birmingham County Football Association's committee at the time of the competition's inauguration, the city's coat of arms, and representations of its main industries.  The main bowl of the trophy featured two engraved drawings, one of an 1880s football match, complete with top-hatted umpire, and one of "the poor and sick succoured by the heavenly spirit".  The plinth had a number of shields engraved with the names of the winning teams, although for unknown reasons some were missing.

Winners
Aston Villa were the most successful team in the competition's history, winning it on thirty occasions outright and sharing the trophy five times.  The club's youth team also jointly won the trophy twice when it was briefly revived in the 1960s as a youth competition.

Notes

References

Defunct football cup competitions in England
History of Birmingham, West Midlands
Sport in Birmingham, West Midlands